The Volleyball Thailand League is the highest level of Thailand club volleyball in the 2014–15 season and the 10th edition.

Team
 Cosmo Chiang Rai
 Chonburi E-tech Air Force
 Kasetsart
 Krungkao Air Force
 Nakhon Ratchasima
 Nakhonnont-Suandusit
 Wing 46 Toyota–Phitsanulok
 Phetchaburi–Bangkok

Ranking

|}

Round 1

|}

Round 2

|}

Final standing

Awards

External links
 Official Website
 Official Facebook

Volleyball,Men's Thailand League
Volleyball,Men's Thailand League
2014